Lahja Hämäläinen is a Finnish ice sledge speed racer. She represented Finland at the 1980 Winter Paralympics, at the 1984 Winter Paralympics and at the 1988 Winter Paralympics. In total, she won four gold medals and three bronze medals.

She won three bronze medals in ice sledge speed racing at the 1980 Winter Paralympics in Geilo, Norway and four gold medals in ice sledge speed racing at the 1984 Winter Paralympics in Innsbruck, Austria.

References

External links 
 

Living people
Year of birth missing (living people)
Place of birth missing (living people)
Paralympic ice sledge speed racers of Finland
Medalists at the 1980 Winter Paralympics
Medalists at the 1984 Winter Paralympics
Paralympic gold medalists for Finland
Paralympic bronze medalists for Finland
Ice sledge speed racers at the 1980 Winter Paralympics
Ice sledge speed racers at the 1984 Winter Paralympics
Paralympic medalists in ice sledge speed racing
20th-century Finnish women
21st-century Finnish women